James George Sherlock (1875 – 16 December 1966) was an English professional golfer. He had four top-10 finishes in the Open Championship, including a sixth place finish in 1904. In his long golf career, he had at least 16 professional wins. He played for the British team against the United States in the 1921 Ryder Cup match at Gleneagles.

Early life
James Sherlock was born in 1875 in High Wycombe, Buckinghamshire, England.

Golf career
1910 was Sherlock's most successful year when, after a disappointing Open Championship, he then won the Olton Professional Tournament, the Portmarnock Professional Tournament, the Tooting Bec Cup and the News of the World Matchplay.

In 1920 Sherlock became the professional at Hunstanton Golf Club, where he remained until 1932 when he moved to Aldeburgh. He played for the British team against the United States in the 1921 Ryder Cup match at Gleneagles.

Sherlock continued playing at an advanced age. He attempted to qualify for the 1939 Open Championship. In 1958 he won his age group (age 70 and over) in the Teachers Senior Professional Tournament scoring 140 over 27 holes. He played in the event as late as 1960 when he was 85 years old.

Death and legacy
Sherlock died on 16 December 1966 at Hunstanton, England, aged 91. He is best remembered for having four top-10 finishes in the Open Championship, including a sixth place finish in 1904 when he had rounds of 83-71-78-77=309 and won £7 10s.

Tournament wins
Note: This list is incomplete.
1901 Olton Professional Tournament
1905 Ranfurly Castle Professional Tournament
1909 Tooting Bec Cup
1910 Olton Professional Tournament, Portmarnock Professional Tournament, Tooting Bec Cup, News of the World Matchplay
1912 Sphere and Tatler Foursomes Tournament (with George Duncan)
1922 Norfolk Professional Championship
1923 Norfolk Professional Championship
1924 Norfolk Professional Championship
1928 Norfolk Professional Championship
1929 Norfolk Professional Championship
1930 Norfolk Professional Championship
1935 Dunlop-Eastern Tournament
1936 Dunlop-Eastern Tournament

Results in major championships

Note: Sherlock only played in The Open Championship.

NT = No tournament
WD = withdrew
CUT = missed the half-way cut
"T" indicates a tie for a place

Team appearances
England–Scotland Professional Match (representing England): 1903, 1904 (tie), 1905 (tie), 1906 (winners) 1907 (winners), 1909 (winners), 1910 (winners), 1912 (tie), 1913 (winners)
Coronation Match (representing the Professionals): 1911 (winners)
Great Britain vs USA (representing Great Britain): 1921 (winners)
Seniors vs Juniors (representing the Seniors): 1928 (winners)

References

English male golfers
Sportspeople from High Wycombe
1875 births
1966 deaths